Dranova Island is an island in eastern Romania, in the southern part of the Danube Delta.

Notes

References
Merriam-Webster's Geographical Dictionary, Third Edition. Springfield, Massachusetts: Merriam-Webster, Incorporated, 1997. .

River islands of Romania
Islands of the Danube